Deas Vail is the third studio album by the indie rock band Deas Vail, released on October 11, 2011.  This was the last record in which original drummer Kelsey Harelson recorded with the band. He played his last show with Deas Vail in Russellville, Arkansas on January 13, 2011. This was also the first album by Deas Vail that Mark Lee Townsend did not produce, and instead was produced by the band and Relient K guitarist Matt Hoopes.

Song listing
"Desire"
"Sixteen"
"Quiet Like Sirens"
"Summer Forgets Me"
"Towers"
"Pulling Down the Sun"
"Bad Dreams"
"Wake Up and Sleep"
"Common Sense"
"The Right Mistakes"
"The Meaning of a Word"
"Meeting in Doorways"

Personnel
Deas Vail
Wes Blaylock - Vocals, acoustic guitar
Justin Froning - Bass
Laura Blaylock - Keyboards, piano, vocals
Andy Moore - Guitar, backing vocals
Kelsey Harelson - Drums
Wes Saunders - Percussion

Production
Matt Hoopes - Producer
Nathan Dantzler - Mastering engineer
Dave Hagan - Recording engineer
Lane Johnson - Drum technician
Brad Wood - Mixing

References

Deas Vail albums
2011 albums
Mono vs Stereo albums